Geertruida "Truus" Looijs (also Looys; born 27 June 1946) is a retired Dutch swimmer. She competed at the 1964 Summer Olympics in the 200 m breaststroke event, but failed to reach the final.

References

1946 births
Living people
Dutch female breaststroke swimmers
Olympic swimmers of the Netherlands
Swimmers at the 1964 Summer Olympics
People from Wageningen
Sportspeople from Gelderland
20th-century Dutch women